Paglaki Ko, Gusto Kong Maging Pornstar is a 2021 Philippine comedy drama film starring Alma Moreno, Rosanna Roces, Ara Mina and Maui Taylor. The film was written and directed by Darryl Yap and edited by Vincent Asis. It premiered on January 29, 2021, through Vivamax.

This is the second film written and directed by Darryl Yap for Viva Films, after his feature-length debut #Jowable (2019) became a success.

Plot 
A group of former porn stars gathered to teach aspiring teen actress to be a porn star and will receive cash each if the actress will be launched.

Cast 

 Alma Moreno as Alma
 Rosanna Roces as Osang
 Ara Mina as Ara
 Maui Taylor as Maui
 AJ Raval as Twinkle
 Ana Jalandoni as Agatha
 Rose Van Ginkel as Sofia
 Kianna Milla as young Twinkle
 Billy Jake Cortez
 Loren Mariñas
 Clifford Pusing
 Henry Villanueva

Production and release 
Yap said that they started to shoot in early August and he also added that film scenes were taken in Subic and Olongapo for two weeks while implementing Alert Rules in the National Capital Region because of the COVID-19 pandemic. The film was premiered on January 29, 2021, on Vivamax. This will serve as Daryl Yap's second movie project on Viva Films.

The Movie and Television Review and Classification Board (MTRCB) gave a rating of X, the first film to be issued the said rating since the controversial 2006 film To Live for the Masses, meaning this film is prohibited to be shown to the general public.

Sequel

A sequel titled Pornstar 2: Pangalawang Putok has been announced and was released on December 3, 2021, on Vivamax.

References 

2021 films
Philippine comedy-drama films
2021 comedy-drama films